Echo Lake is a lake along the course of the Qu'Appelle River in the Canadian province of Saskatchewan. Echo Lake is so named because of the echo heard by the First Nations while paddling on the lake. It is one of four lakes that make up the Fishing Lakes. Pasqua Lake is upstream and Mission Lake is downstream. The lake can be accessed by Highway 56 and Highway 210.

Echo Lake, as well as the other three Fishing Lakes, are all in the deep-cut Qu'Appelle Valley, which was formed about 14,000 years ago during the last ice age. Meltwater from the glaciers carved out the valley and as water levels rose and fell, alluvium was left in the wake. These piles of alluvium are what created the separations between the lakes.

Communities
Echo Lake is located in the RM of North Qu'Appelle No. 187. The town of Fort Qu'Appelle is the largest community, not just on Echo Lake, but all of the Fishing Lakes. It is located at the eastern end of the lake, between Echo and Mission Lakes. Echo Lake is home to two resort villages; B-Say-Tah is on a point of land along the southern shore and Fort San is located opposite B-Say-Tah on the northern shore. Standing Buffalo Indian Reserve is located at the north-western corner of the lake and occupies the northern half of the isthmus that separated Echo Lake from Pasqua Lake.

Recreation 
Echo Valley Provincial Park is located at the western end of the lake, south of Standing Buffalo and west of B-Say-Tah. The park features camping, hiking, and access to both Pasqua and Echo Lakes for boating, swimming, and fishing. The beach at the park is called Echo Beach. Other beaches along the lake's shore include B-Say-Tah Point Beach and Fort Qu’Appelle Valley Centre beach.

Echo Lake Bible Camp is located west of Fort San along Highway 57.

Saskatchewan Fish Hatchery 
The hatchery produces between 40 and 50 million total fish annually, including both exotic and native species, which includes 500,000 trout and 20 million walleye. The hatchery is responsible for stocking over 200 bodies of water in Saskatchewan, including up to 150 lakes. It is the only aquaculture facility in Saskatchewan that produces fish for public angling opportunities.

In November 2014, the administration of the Saskatchewan Fish Hatchery was transferred from the Government of Saskatchewan to the Saskatchewan Wildlife Federation. The operating costs are funded by Saskatchewan’s Fish and Wildlife Development Fund (FWDF).

Gallery

Fish species 
Fish commonly found in the lake include northern pike, walleye, and yellow perch.

See also 
List of lakes of Saskatchewan
Hudson Bay drainage basin

References

External links

Lakes of Saskatchewan
Division No. 6, Saskatchewan
North Qu'Appelle No. 187, Saskatchewan